Aleksandr Petrovich Grushin (born 8 March 1984) is a Russian former professional football player.

Club career
He played in the Russian Football National League for FC Dynamo Barnaul in 2008.

External links
 
 

1984 births
Sportspeople from Barnaul
Living people
Russian footballers
Association football defenders
FC Dynamo Barnaul players
FC Novokuznetsk players